Sunnyslope is a hamlet in southern Alberta, Canada within Kneehill County. The first post office was opened in 1903.

Demographics 

See also 
List of communities in Alberta
List of designated places in Alberta
List of hamlets in Alberta

References 

Designated places in Alberta
Hamlets in Alberta
Kneehill County